New Jersey's 5th congressional district is represented by Democrat Josh Gottheimer, who has served in Congress since 2017. The district stretches across the entire northern border of the state and contains most of Bergen County, as well as parts of Passaic County and Sussex County.

Historically, most of the areas in the district have generally been favorable for Republicans. This is especially true of the western portion, which contains some of the most Republican areas in the Northeast. However, Bergen County has trended Democratic in recent elections, though not as overwhelmingly as in the more urbanized southern portion of Bergen County, this latter portion being in the ninth congressional district. Partly due to a strong performance in Bergen County, Josh Gottheimer unseated 14-year Republican incumbent Scott Garrett in 2016. This made Garrett the only one of the state's 12 incumbents to lose reelection that year and marked the first time a Democrat won this seat since 1930.

Since redistricting in the early 1990s, this congressional district has been L-shaped, comprising the rural northern and western parts of New Jersey along with parts of Passaic and Bergen County. After redistricting in late 2021, which was based on the 2020 census, the 5th lost all of its towns in Warren County. It also contains less of Sussex County and includes more of eastern Bergen County than was the case during the 2010s, making the district somewhat more Democratic.

Counties and municipalities in the district

For the 118th and successive Congresses (based on redistricting following the 2020 United States Census), the district contains all or portions of three counties and 65 municipalities.

Bergen County (47)
Allendale, Alpine, Bergenfield, Bogota, Closter, Cresskill, Demarest, Dumont, Emerson, Englewood, Englewood Cliffs, Fair Lawn, Fort Lee, Glen Rock, Hackensack, Harrington Park, Haworth, Hillsdale, Ho-Ho-Kus, Leonia, Mahwah, Maywood (part; also 9th), Midland Park, Montvale, New Milford, Northvale, Norwood, Old Tappan, Oradell, Palisades Park, Paramus, Park Ridge, Ramsey, Ridgefield Park, Ridgewood, River Edge, River Vale, Rockleigh, Saddle River, Teaneck, Tenafly, Upper Saddle River, Waldwick, Washington Township, Westwood, Woodcliff Lake and Wyckoff

Passaic County (4)
Bloomingdale, Ringwood, Wanaque, and West Milford

Sussex County (14)
Andover Township, Branchville, Frankford Township, Franklin Borough, Hamburg, Hampton Township, Hardyston Township, Lafayette Township, Montague Township, Newton, Sandyston Township, Sussex, Vernon Township, and Wantage Township

Recent results from statewide elections 
Results Under Current Lines (Since 2023)

Results Under Old Lines

List of members representing the district

Recent election results

2012

2014

2016

2018

2020

2022

References

 Congressional Biographical Directory of the United States 1774–present

External links
Josh Gottheimer (D) official website

05
Bergen County, New Jersey
Passaic County, New Jersey
Sussex County, New Jersey
Warren County, New Jersey
Constituencies established in 1799
1799 establishments in New Jersey
Constituencies disestablished in 1801
1801 disestablishments in New Jersey
Constituencies established in 1843
1843 establishments in New Jersey